Bruce Chadwick spent 23 years as a journalist with the New York Daily News before earning a doctorate in American history in 1994 at Rutgers University, where he now teaches part-time.

Writing career
He is a professor, historian, lecturer and author of over 28 books, including a lengthy series on baseball history  including books on the New York Yankees, Boston Red Sox and Chicago Cubs.  Aside from books on Major League teams, Chadwick also wrote about Negro league baseball and a book about The Minor Leagues.

His first American Civil War book, Brother Again Brother: The Lost Civil War Diary of Lt. Edmund Halsey (Citadel Press, 1997), was followed by the dual biography of the Civil War’s leaders, Two American Presidents: Abraham Lincoln and Jefferson Davis, 1861-1865 (Citadel, 1999), a finalist for the Lincoln Prize. Chadwick’s newest books are 1858: Abraham Lincoln, Jefferson Davis, Robert E. Lee, Ulysses S. Grant and the War They Failed to See (Sourcebooks, 2008), about the causes of the Civil War. I Am Murdered: George Wythe, Thomas Jefferson, and the Killing That Shocked a New Nation (Wiley, 2009), about the slaying of a Founding Father was published in the winter of 2008.

Teaching career
He also teaches English and history at New Jersey City University in Jersey City, New Jersey.

Selected bibliography

 1858: Abraham Lincoln, Jefferson Davis, Robert E. Lee, Ulysses S. Grant and the War They Failed to See
 Lincoln for President: An Unlikely Candidate, An Audacious Strategy, and the Victory No One Saw Coming
 
 The First American Army: The Untold Story of George Washington and the Men behind America's First Fight for Freedom
 The General and Mrs. Washington
 When the Game Was Black and White: The Illustrated History of Baseball's Negro Leagues
 Traveling The Underground Railroad: A Visitor's Guide to More Than 300 Sites

Filmography

References

External links
 Bruce Chadwick : bio
 Bruce Chadwick
 
 C-SPAN Q&A interview with Chadwick, August 2, 2009
 Interview on 1858 at the Pritzker Military Museum & Library on April 9, 2008

21st-century American historians
Living people
Rutgers University alumni
American male journalists
Year of birth missing (living people)
20th-century American historians
20th-century American journalists
American male non-fiction writers
20th-century American male writers
20th-century American non-fiction writers
21st-century American male writers
21st-century American non-fiction writers
Rutgers University faculty
New York Daily News people
Sports historians
Historians of the American Civil War
New Jersey City University faculty
Historians from New York (state)